" Angel" is a song by Australian singer songwriter, Gina Jeffreys and was released on 5 March 2001 as the lead single from her fifth studio album, Angel. It peaked at number 57 on the ARIA Singles Chart.

At the APRA Awards of 2002, "Angel" won ‘Most Performed Country Work’. and won Jeffreys her fifth Golden guitar award at the Tamworth Country Music Awards of Australia in 2002 for ‘Video Clip of the Year’.
The song’s video was a finalist in the Australian Animation Awards of 2001.

Track listing

Charts

Release history

References

2001 singles
Songs written by Rick Price
2001 songs
Gina Jeffreys songs
APRA Award winners
EMI Records singles